The 1973 FIBA Intercontinental Cup William Jones was the 7th edition of the FIBA Intercontinental Cup for men's basketball clubs. It took place at Ginásio do Ibirapuera, São Paulo. From the FIBA European Champions Cup participated Ignis Varese and Jugoplastika, from the South American Club Championship participated Sírio and Vaqueros de Bayamón, and from the NABL participated the Lexington Marathon Oilers.

Participants

League stage
Day 1, May 1 1973

|}

Day 2, May 2 1973

|}

Day 3, May 3 1973

|}

Day 4, May 4, 1973

|}

Day 5, May 5, 1973

|}

Final standings

External links
 1973 Intercontinental Cup William Jones

1973
1972–73 in American basketball
1972–73 in South American basketball
1972–73 in European basketball
1973 in Brazilian sport
International basketball competitions hosted by Brazil